Jonathan Orr (born March 20, 1983 in Detroit, Michigan) is a former American football wide receiver  who played for the NFL's Oakland Raiders and Tennessee Titans. He was drafted in the sixth round, pick 172 of the 2006 NFL Draft by the Titans. He played college football at the University of Wisconsin–Madison.

Early years
Orr attended Henry Ford High School in Detroit, Michigan, and in addition to being a letterman in football and track, he served as class president his senior year.

Collegiate career

Collegiate statistics

2002 season
With Wisconsin missing top receiver Lee Evans due to a torn ACL suffered in the Spring Game, Orr stepped up in a big way for the Badgers, catching 47 passes for 842 yards and 8 touchdowns. He played in all 14 games for Wisconsin.

2003 season
Orr suffered through a significant sophomore slump, catching just 7 passes yet appearing in all 13 games for the Badgers.

2004 season
Orr caught 13 passes for 177 yards and 3 touchdowns. He would play in all 13 games.

2005 season
In his senior season, Orr would catch 40 passes for 688 yards with eight touchdown receptions. He ranked first on the team in touchdown receptions.

In the season opener, against Bowling Green, Orr made 3 receptions for 38 yards with a touchdown. He would not record a single reception in the next game against Temple, but rebounded to record 4 receptions for 33 yards against North Carolina in Kenan Memorial Stadium.
As Big Ten conference play began, Orr was held to just one catch in Wisconsin's win over Michigan, their first since 1994. Against Indiana the next week, Jonathan Orr caught 4 passes for 128 yards with a touchdown. His efforts against Indiana, however, would be trumped by his game against Northwestern in Evanston, where he caught 5 receptions for 87 yards, with 4 touchdown receptions. However, his amazing game was not enough to keep the Badgers undefeated, as they fell to the Wildcats in a wild 48-51 loss.

Against Minnesota, Orr caught 3 passes for 64 yards. In a game against Purdue in Camp Randall Stadium the next week, Orr hauled in 4 passes for 53 yards, and against Illinois the week after, he caught 5 passes for 41 yards. In a game against eventual Big Ten champion Penn State, Orr found room for 89 yards on just 3 receptions against one of the top defenses in the nation. In his final home game, the Badgers were upset by the Iowa Hawkeyes; Orr caught just one pass for 9 yards. Against Hawaii in his final regular season game with the Badgers, Orr caught 3 passes for 60 yards, with 2 touchdown receptions as the Badgers won their 9th game of the year, 41-24. In the 2006 Capital One Bowl against Auburn, Orr would catch 4 passes for 74 yards in a 24-10 Wisconsin win.

Orr was selected in the 6th round of the 2006 NFL Draft by the Tennessee Titans.

Professional career
Orr did not play in any games for the Tennessee Titans his rookie season and was released from the team on August 26, 2007. On September 4, 2007, he was signed to the Oakland Raiders practice squad. On September 21 he was released by the Raiders.

References

External links
 Jonathan Orr's stats from the 2002 Wisconsin Badgers football team
 Jonathan Orr's stats from the 2003 Wisconsin Badgers football team
 Jonathan Orr's stats from the 2004 Wisconsin Badgers football team
 Jonathan Orr's stats from the 2005 Wisconsin Badgers football team

1983 births
Living people
American football wide receivers
Players of American football from Detroit
Henry Ford High School (Detroit, Michigan) alumni
Wisconsin Badgers football players
Tennessee Titans players